In Taiwan, law can be studied in an undergraduate program resulting in a Bachelor of Law (LL.B.) or a postgraduate degree resulting in a Masters of Law (LL.M.). Some LL.M. programs in Taiwan are offered to students with or without a legal background. However, the graduation requirements for students with a legal background are lower than for those students who do not have a legal background (to account for fundamental legal subjects that were taken during undergraduate studies). Students studying in an LL.M. program normally take three years to earn the necessary credits and finish a master’s thesis. Ph.D. degrees are also offered in the area of law.

Students in law school receive academic rather than practical training.  Practical training is arranged only after the individual passes the lawyer, judge or prosecutor exams.

Law schools
Aletheia University Department of Financial and Economic Law
Asia University Department of Financial and Economic Law
Chinese Culture University College of Law
Chung Yuan Christian University Financial and Economic Law
Tunghai University College of Law
Fu Jen Catholic University College of Law
Hsuan Chuang University College of Law
Kainan University Department of Law
Ming Chuan University School of Law
National Cheng Kung University College of Law
National Chengchi University College of Law
National Chung Cheng University College of Law
National Chung Hsing University School of Law
National Dong Hwa University Department of Law
National Taipei University College of Law
National Taiwan University College of Law
National University of Kaohsiung College of Law
National Yang Ming Chiao Tung University School of Law
Providence University Department of Law
Shih Hsin University College of Law
Soochow University School of Law

Compulsory courses for undergraduate students
According to the National Taiwan University College of Law:

First year
Constitutional law
Civil Code - General Principle I
Criminal Code - General Principles I
Civil Code - General Provisions of Obligations

Second year
Civil Code - General Provisions of Obligations II
Civil Code - Kinds of Provisions of Obligations
Civil Code - Property
Civil Code - Family and Succession law
Criminal Code - General Principles II
Criminal Code - Kinds of Offenses
Administrative Law
Legal History
International Law

Third year
Civil Procedure
Criminal Procedure
General Principles of Business Law & Corporation Law
Insurance Law
Law of Negotiable Instruments
Maritime Law
Jurisprudence

Fourth year
Conflict of Laws

Fifth year
Some law schools in Taiwan have a five-year LL.B. program to incorporate courses with specialties into their curriculum. Soochow University School of Law, for example, is well known for its five-year LL.B. program featuring Anglo-American law and comparative legal studies.

See also

 Education in Taiwan
 History of education in Taiwan
 List of schools in Taiwan
 List of universities in Taiwan
 History of law in Taiwan
 Constitution of the Taiwan (ROC)
 Six Codes
 Law of the Taiwan (ROC)
 Ministry of Justice (Taiwan)
 Judicial Yuan
 Supreme Court of the Taiwan (ROC)
 Supreme Prosecutor Office
 Taiwan High Prosecutors Office
 District Courts of the Taiwan (ROC)
 Referendums in Taiwan
 Democracy Index
 Modified Sainte-Laguë method with 234 seats or more
 Open list PR
 Unicameralism
 Jury trial with 12
 Judicial review
 Bill of Rights
 Separation of church and state
 Separation of investment and retail banking
 Corruption Perceptions Index

Further reading
Lo Chang-fa, The Legal Culture and System of Taiwan, Chapter 2, (Kluwer Law International 2006).

References

External links
Taiwan Law Resources
ROC Ministry of Education
The History of the Ministry of Education
Study in Taiwan
National Taiwan University College of Law
 National Chung Cheng University College of Law
Soochow University School of Law
National Chengchi University College of Law
Fu Jen Catholic University School of Law
National Taipei University College of Law
National Cheng Kung University College of Law
Top Law Schools in Asia

 
Law schools
Taiwan
Taiwan, law schools
Taiwan education-related lists